SDSO may refer to:
 San Diego County Sheriff's Department, a law enforcement agency in San Diego County, California
 Scottish Dark Sky Observatory, an astronomical observatory in Scotland
 South Dakota Symphony Orchestra, an American orchestra from Sioux Falls, South Dakota